The Krishnapur Matha ( कृष्णपुरा मठ  Kr̥ṣṇāpura maṭha)  or Krishnapur Mutt in some records and literature is a Madhwa Vaishnava monastery. It is one of the Ashta Mathas of Udupi founded by Dvaita philosopher Madhvacharya of Udupi. Krishnapur Monastery is currently headed by Vidyasagara Thirta. The first swami of this monastery was Janardhana Thirta, who was one of the direct disciples of Madhvacharya. Its presiding deity is Kalingamardhana Krishna. The matha houses a Mukyaprana temple inside where puja is performed every day.

This monastic order has many branches all over India. Some are at Udupi, Ramanakatte, Padigaru, Pejavara, Dandathirtha, Padubidri and others mostly in districts of Dakshina Kannada and Udupi of Karnataka and one in Prayag (Allahabad).

The Krishnapur Matha owned last large tracts of land, but lost due to enactment of the law "Tiller is the owner of Land" by then Chief minister of Karnataka state Devaraj Urs in 1974.

The Matha (monastery) at Krishnapur, which is 3 kilometres from Surathkal locality of Mangalore, is the main Maths from which the name has been derived. The present Matha at Krishnapur was built by Sri Vidyamurthi Teertha who is twenty sixth Swamiji in this lineage built Matha ( monastery at) Krishnapur. There is a Mukhyaprana  Hanuman temple inside the Matha. The structure of the building is mostly made of wood. This type of structure is rare in the age of concrete buildings nowadays.

Gallery

The lineage of Swamiji's (Guru parampara) of Krishnapur Matha 

Sri Madhvacharya(1238-1317)
Sri Janaradhana Teertha(1317-1319)
Sri Srivatsanka Teertha(1319-1359)
Sri Vageesha Teertha(1359-1407)
Sri Lokesha Teertha(1407-1447)
Sri Lokanaatha Teertha(1447-1461)
Sri Lokapoojya Teertha(1461-1473)
Sri Vidyaaraja Teertha(1473-1483)
Sri Vishwaaadhiraja Teertha(1483-1493)
Sri Vishwaadheesha Teertha(1493-1506
Sri Vishwesha Teertha(1506-1519)
Sri Vishwavandya Teertha(1519-1530)
Sri Vishwaraaja Teertha(1530-1541)
Sri Dharaneedhara Teertha(1541-1555)
Sri Dharaadhara Teertha(1555-1567)
Sri Prajnaamoorthi Teertha -I(1567-1578)
Sri Tapomoorthi Teertha(1578-1589)
Sri Sureshwara Teertha(1589-1601)
Sri Jagannaatha Teertha(1601-1614)
Sri Suresha Teertha(1614-1627)
Sri Vishwapungava Teertha(1627-1638)
Sri Vishwavallabha Teertha(1638-1649)
Sri Vishwabhooshana Teertha(1649-1659)
Sri Yaadhavendra Teertha(1659-1670)
Sri Prajnaamoorthi Teertha II(1670-1701)
Sri Vidyaadhiraja Teertha(1701-1705)
Sri Vidyamoorthi Teertha(1705-1766)
Sri Vidyavallabha Teertha(1766-1775)
Sri Vidyendra Teertha(1775-1784)
Sri Vidyaanidhi Teertha(1784-1799)
Sri Vidyaasamudra Teertha(1799-1820)
Sri Vidyaapathi Teertha ( Expired before assuming office )(1820-1820)
Sri Vidyaadheesha Teertha(1820-1886)
Sri Vidyaapoorna Teertha(1886-1938)
Sri Vidyarathna Teertha(1938-1972)
Sri Vidya Saagara Teertha (present Swamiji)(1972)

References 

" UDUPI AN INTRODUCTION " a booklet published by Krishnapur Mutt.

Vaishnavism
Krishnapur Matha
Madhavacharya mathas in India
Hindu organisations based in India